Kevin Dunn (born August 24, 1955) is an American actor who has appeared in supporting roles in a number of films and television series since the 1980s.

Dunn's roles include White House Communications Director Alan Reed in the political comedy Dave, U.S. Army Colonel Hicks in the 1998 version of Godzilla, a role he reprised for the animated adaptation of Godzilla, Alan Abernathy's father Stuart in Small Soldiers, Sam Witwicky's father Ron in the Transformers film series, Oscar Galvin in the 2010 action thriller Unstoppable, and misanthropic White House Chief of Staff Ben Cafferty in Veep. He has also had recurring roles on True Detective in 2014 and on the TV series adaptation of The Mosquito Coast in 2021.

Early life and education 
Dunn was born in Chicago, the son of John Dunn, a musician and poet, and his wife Margaret (née East), a nurse. His sister is actress/comedian Nora Dunn. He also has a brother, Michael Dunn, a High school history teacher and football coach. He was raised in a Catholic family, and has Irish, English, Scottish, and German ancestry. Dunn graduated from Illinois Wesleyan University in 1977, and received an honorary doctorate in 2008 from the same school.

Dunn married Katina Alexander in 1986. They have a son, Jack.

Career 
Dunn appeared in many live performances in Chicago and suburbs, including the theater companies Northlight, Remains, Wisdom Bridge and Goodman before his TV and motion picture career. Dunn's work includes Samantha Who?, a series appearing on ABC from 2007 to 2009, as well as playing Ron Witwicky in Michael Bay's Transformers film series. His film appearances include Small Soldiers, Stir of Echoes, Godzilla, Snake Eyes, Nixon, Mad Love, Ghostbusters II, Dave, Beethoven's 2nd, Hot Shots!, and 1492: Conquest of Paradise. Dunn also played Murry Wilson in a 2000 miniseries, The Beach Boys: An American Family. He played President Richard Nixon's White House Counsel, Charles Colson, in Nixon and played President Bill Clinton's National Security Advisor, Sandy Berger, in the ABC miniseries The Path to 9/11. In 2000, he co-starred in Bette, a sitcom starring Bette Midler, in which he played her husband in the show's first 11 episodes.
From 2004 to 2006 Dunn had a small recurring role as a baseball coach and mentor to Tyler Hoechlin character Martin Brewer, Terry Hardwick on the long-running family drama 7th Heaven. 

Dunn played Joel Horneck, Jerry's overzealous childhood friend, in the Seinfeld episode "Male Unbonding". He has also featured in Live Free or Die as well as the 2006 film Gridiron Gang.

Dunn is an executive producer of the award-winning documentary film Kumpanía: Flamenco Los Angeles (2011).

Filmography

Film

Television

References

External links 
 
 

20th-century American male actors
21st-century American male actors
American male film actors
American male television actors
American people of English descent
American people of German descent
American people of Irish descent
American people of Scottish descent
American Roman Catholics
Illinois Wesleyan University alumni
Living people
Male actors from Chicago
Year of birth missing (living people)